The community of Llwydcoed, Rhondda Cynon Taf was, for much of the twentieth century, and electoral ward for the purposes of electing members to Glamorgan County Council and the Aberdare Urban District Council. Llwydcoed is no longer an electoral ward but forms part of Aberdare West/Llwydcoed electoral ward for the purposes of Rhondda Cynon Taf unitary authority elections

Llwydcoed first became an electoral ward in the late nineteenth century with the formation of Glamorgan County Council. Llwydcoed was also an electoral ward of the Aberdare Urban District Council from its formation in 1894.

History 1889–1914

The first representative was the venerable Rees Hopkin Rhys who was succeeded by the Liberal industrialist Rees Llewellyn

Glamorgan County Council
In 1889, Rees Hopkin Rhys was elected as member for Llwydcoed, defeating Griffith George.

Rhys was re-elected unopposed in 1892 and although described as a Liberal this was unlikely.

Boundary changes in 1895 saw Rhys, now 75 years of age opposed by Richard Morgan, whose Hirwaun seat had been abolished.

Rhys was again elected unopposed in 1898

Rhys died in 1899 and was succeeded by Rees Llewellyn.

In 1901, Llewellyn was re-elected.

He was again re-elected in  1904.

Llewellyn was again re-elected unopposed in 1907

Despite occasional challenges by the Labour Party at district council level (see below), labour did not challenge for the county seat in this period.

Aberdare Urban District Council
Llwydcoed was also an electoral ward of the Aberdare Urban District Council from its formation in 1894.

 

In 1899, Owen Harries was again returned unopposed.

In 1900, two members were elected owing to the vacant seat following the death of Rees Hopkin Rhys. John William Evans, whip had failed to be elected at the initial election in 1894 but who subsequently became a county councillor and a county alderman, was seventeen votes ahead of sitting councillor Rees Llewellyn.

In 1901, Llewellyn was re-elected by a large majority.

In 1902, Owen Harris was once again returned unopposed. 

In 1903,  J.W. Evans was re-elected unopposed.

In 1904 an additional seat was created, allowing T. Walter Williams to be returned alongside Rees Llewellyn.

In 1905, following the death of Owen Harris, his son, Morgan J. Harris, was elected in his place after defeating a Labour candidate.

In 1906, John William Evans stood down due to ill health and died shortly afterwards. He was succeeded by J.O. George who defeated a Labour candidate.

1907 saw the return of the sitting members by a comfortable majority.

Cynon Valley Borough Council
Between 1973 and 1996 Llwydcoed was a ward for Cynon Valley Borough Council. The ward elected six borough councillors, reducing to one councillor from 1986.

1995–
Llwydcoed is no longer an electoral ward but forms part of Aberdare West/Llwydcoed for the purposes of Rhondda Cynon Taf unitary authority elections. Since 1995 Aberdare West/Llwydcoed has been represented by Plaid Cymru and Labour councillors.

References

Glamorgan electoral wards
Former wards of Wales